was a Japanese art historian, critic and businessman who served as the fifth president of the Japan Ceramics Association from 1984 to 1990.  Before that, he was also a sympathiser for the cause of the Japanese Communist Party.

Biography
Although he did not enroll in a college or university, Ōkōchi was a member of the Urawa Higher literary group within the Shinjinkai. He studied at Tokyo Imperial University. In 1930, he solicited the fund for the cause of the Japanese Communist Party, for which Miki contributed to.

During World War II, he worked for Riken as an executive in the Riken Konzern. After the Riken Konzern was disbanded, he began to study the history of ceramics. He served as the president of the Japan Ceramics Association from 1984, succeeding Kō Segawa, until his death in 1990.

Personal life
Ōkōchi was the eldest son of Viscount Masatoshi Ōkōchi, the third director of Riken.  His younger brother was Nobuhiro Ōkōchi.  He was the first husband of actress Shizue Kawarazaki.

Ancestry

References

1902 births
1990 deaths
20th-century Japanese businesspeople
Japanese art historians
Japanese communists
Japanese critics
Ōkōchi clan
Businesspeople from Tokyo
Riken personnel
University of Tokyo alumni